Leonard Skeat (9 February 1937 – 9 March 2021) was a British jazz double-bassist, and the younger brother of Bill Skeat, a saxophone player (1926–1999).

Biography
He was born in East End of London, and worked with the Ted Heath band. During the 1970s, he was in demand and almost resident at the Pizza Express Jazz Club, and Pizza on the Park Jazz Club (closed 2010) in London. He was a member of the band, Velvet.

Skeat recorded with Mel Tormé, Ben Webster, Billy Eckstine, Lionel Hampton, Scott Hamilton, Helen Merrill, Lou Rawls, Harry Edison, Denny Wright, Digby Fairweather, Spike Robinson, Eddie Lockjaw Davis, Stéphane Grappelli, Dick Morrissey, Bill Watrous, and Randy Sandke. He was also a member of the Eddie Thompson Trio and Charly Antolini's Jazz Power.

Discography
With Charly Antolini
 1989 Cookin' (L+R)
 1990 Charly Antolini Meets Dick Morrissey
 1993 Right-On (Bell)

With Bud Freeman
 1980  The Dolphin Has A Message

With Spike Robinson
 1984 Spike Robinson-Eddie Thompson Trip/At Chesters Volumes 1 & 2 (Hep)
 1986 In Town with Elaine Delmar (Hep)
 1987 The Gershwin Collection (Hep)

With Bill Watrous
 1982 Bill Watrous in London

References

External links
 

1937 births
2021 deaths
British jazz double-bassists
Male double-bassists
British male jazz musicians
21st-century double-bassists
21st-century British male musicians